The Air Member for Materiel is the senior Royal Air Force officer responsible for procurement matters. The post-holder is a member of the Air Force Board and is in charge of all aspects of procurement and organisation for RAF regular, reserve and civilian staffs worldwide.

History
The post which was created in 1923 was originally known as the Air Member for Supply and Research; it was renamed Air Member for Supply and Organisation in 1936 and Air Member for Logistics in 1994. Since 2007 it has been the Air Member for Materiel.

Holders of the post
Holders of the post have included:
Air Member for Supply and Research
1923 Air Vice-Marshal G H Salmond
December 1926 Air Marshal J F A Higgins
September 1930 Air Marshal H C T Dowding
Air Member for Supply and Organisation
14 January 1935 Air Vice Marshal C L N Newall
1 September 1937 Air Vice Marshal W L Welsh
15 January 1940 Air Marshal Sir Christopher Courtney
14 September 1945 Air Marshal Sir Leslie Hollinghurst                  
1 September 1948 Air Chief Marshal Sir George Pirie                 
2 March 1950 Air Chief Marshal Sir William Dickson 
1 September 1952 Air Chief Marshal Sir John Whitworth-Jones 
1 May 1954 Air Chief Marshal Sir Donald Hardman          
1 January 1958 Air Chief Marshal Sir Walter Dawson                        
8 April 1960 Air Marshal Sir Walter Merton 
1963 Air Marshal Sir John Baker-Carr (acting)               
1 August 1963 Air Marshal Sir John Davis                                
2 August 1966 Air Marshal Sir Charles Broughton        
4 September 1968 Air Marshal Sir Thomas Prickett            
1 December 1970 Air Marshal Sir Neil Wheeler    
27 March 1973 Air Marshal Sir Anthony Heward            
3 June 1976 Air Marshal Sir Alasdair Steedman                     
28 September 1977 Air Marshal Sir John Nicholls    
1 December 1978 Air Marshal Sir Rex Roe                       
4 July 1981 Air Chief Marshal Sir John Rogers                        
1 January 1983 Air Marshal Sir Michael Knight             
7 February 1985 Air Marshal Sir Michael Armitage                      
27 November 1987 Air Marshal Sir Patrick Hine                 
5 August 1988 Air Marshal Sir Brendan Jackson
Air Member for Logistics
1 April 1994 Air Chief Marshal Sir Michael Alcock
8 March 1996 Air Chief Marshal Sir John Allison 
11 July 1997  Air Marshal Sir Colin Terry
30 April 1999 Air Marshal Malcolm Pledger 
3 September 1999 Air Vice-Marshal Graham Skinner
Note: From 1999 to 2004 the post was vacant
2004 Air Vice-Marshal Barry Thornton
January 2006 Air Vice-Marshal David Rennison
Air Member for Materiel
April 2007 Air Marshal Sir Barry Thornton
May 2009 Air Marshal Sir Kevin Leeson
October 2012 Air Marshal Sir Simon Bollom
April 2016 Air Marshal Sir Julian Young
September 2020 Vice Admiral Richard Thompson

References

Royal Air Force appointments